WRAT (95.9 FM, "95.9 The Rat") is a commercial radio station licensed to serve Point Pleasant, New Jersey. The station is owned by Beasley Broadcast Group through licensee Beasley Media Group Licenses, LLC. It airs a mainstream rock radio format.

WRAT has an effective radiated power (ERP) of 4,000 watts analog and 400 watts digital.  It broadcasts using HD Radio. The station's programming is simulcast on the HD2 subchannel of sister station WJRZ-FM, which feeds FM translator W300AO in Manahawkin, New Jersey, on 107.9 MHz.

History

WADB
On October 4, 1968, the station first signed on the air as WADB.  It was a beautiful music station, owned by Pleasant Broadcasters, named after the city of license, Point Pleasant, New Jersey. The station played quarter hour sweeps of instrumental cover versions of popular songs and Broadway showtunes. The studios were on F Street in South Belmar. (The neighborhood is now known as Lake Como.) The station's call sign used the initials of its founder, Adamant Brown and his wife Dorothy.

WADB made use of early automation equipment for radio stations. Large carousels loaded with broadcast-spec tape cartridges were used for the majority of advertising messages. Large reels of taped music with cues to play the commercials allowed the station to run with minimal involvement from the staff. An SMC digital programmer controlled the operation. The station's easy listening format was broadcast in Southern Monmouth and Northern Ocean Counties.

WRAT
A group of investors, known as the New Jersey Broadcast Partners, acquired the station in 1996.  After a Labor Day Weekend stunt during which the song "Rat in Mi Kitchen" by UB40 was aired continuously, WADB flipped to an active rock format on Labor Day Monday, 1996. The call sign switched to WRAT. The first song was AC/DC's "For Those About To Rock (We Salute You). "

Greater Media ownership
In 2001, the station was acquired by Greater Media, a large national owner with its headquarters in New Jersey. 

WRAT was among the first radio stations in the market to carry its radio broadcasts over its internet website. The station started streaming to allow listeners in fringe areas to get the station on-line.

On March 9, 2014, WRAT extended its coverage to include southern and central Ocean County by adding a 250-watt FM translator at 107.9 FM.  W300AO transmits from a 300-foot tower on Beach Avenue in Manahawkin, New Jersey. The 107.9 signal covers Long Beach Island, Tuckerton, Beach Haven, Barnegat and Manahawkin. Its coverage is limited to the west by co-channel 107.9 WPPZ in Pennsauken, New Jersey.

Beasley ownership
On July 19, 2016, Beasley Media Group announced it would acquire Greater Media and its 21 stations (including WRAT) for $240 million. It was also at this time WRAT joined the iHeartRadio streaming service.

The Federal Communications Commission approved the sale on October 6, and the sale closed on November 1.

References

External links

RAT
RAT
Radio stations established in 1996
Point Pleasant, New Jersey
Lake Como, New Jersey